A spoiled child or spoiled brat is a derogatory term aimed at children who exhibit behavioral problems from being overindulged by their parents or other caregivers. Children and teens who are perceived as spoiled may be described as "overindulged", "grandiose", "narcissistic" or "egocentric-regressed".  When the child has a neurological condition such as autism, ADHD or intellectual disability, observers may see them as "spoiled”. There is no specific scientific definition of what "spoiled" means, and professionals are often unwilling to use the label because it is considered vague and derogatory. Being spoiled is not recognized as a mental disorder in any of the medical manuals, such as the ICD-10 or the DSM-IV, or its successor, the DSM-5.

As syndrome
Richard Weaver, in his work Ideas Have Consequences, introduced the term “spoiled child psychology” in 1948. In 1989, Bruce McIntosh coined the term the "spoiled child syndrome". The syndrome is characterized by "excessive, self-centered, and immature behavior". It includes lack of consideration for other people, recurrent temper tantrums, an inability to handle the delay of gratification, demands for having one's own way, obstructiveness, and manipulation to get their way. McIntosh attributed the syndrome to "the failure of parents to enforce consistent, age-appropriate limits", but others, such as Aylward, note that temperament is probably a contributory factor. Temper tantrums are recurrent. McIntosh observes that "many of the problem behaviors that cause parental concern are unrelated to spoiling as properly understood". Children may have occasional temper tantrums without them falling under the umbrella of "spoiled". Extreme cases of spoiled child syndrome will involve frequent temper tantrums, physical aggression, defiance, destructive behavior, and refusal to comply with even the simple demands of daily tasks.  This can be similar to the profile of children diagnosed with Pathological Demand Avoidance, which is part of the autism spectrum.

Potential causes
 Failure of parents to enforce consistent, age-appropriate limits.
 Parents shielding the child from normal everyday frustrations.
 Provision of excessive material gifts, even when the child has not behaved appropriately.
 Improper role models provided by parents.

Differential diagnosis
Children with underlying medical or mental health problems may exhibit some of the symptoms.    Speech or hearing disorders, and attention deficit disorder, may lead to children's failing to understand the limits set by parents. Children who have recently experienced a stressful event, such as the separation of the parents (divorce) or the birth or death of a close family relative, may also exhibit some or all of the symptoms. Children of parents who themselves have psychiatric disorders may manifest some of the symptoms, because the parents behave erratically, sometimes failing to perceive their children's behavior correctly, and thus fail to properly or consistently define limits of normal behavior for them.

Prevention
Parents can seek advice, support, and encouragement to empower them in parenthood from diverse sources.

Treatment
Treatment by a physician involves assessing parental competence, and whether the parents set limits correctly and consistently. Physicians will rule out dysfunction in the family, referring dysfunctional families for family therapy and dysfunctional parents for parenting skills training, and counsel parents in methods for modifying their child's behavior.

Infants
In early infancy, a baby signals desire for food, contact, and comfort by crying. This behavior can be viewed as a distress signal indicating that some biological need is not being met. While parents sometimes worry about spoiling their children by giving them too much attention, specialists in child development maintain that babies cannot be spoiled in the first six months of life. During the first year, children are developing a sense of basic trust and attachment.

Only children

Alfred Adler (1870–1937) believed that "only children" were likely to experience a variety of problems from their situation. Adler theorized that because only children have no rivals for their parents' affection, they will become pampered and spoiled, particularly by their mother. He suggested that this could later cause interpersonal difficulties if the person is not universally liked and admired.

A 1987 quantitative review of 141 studies on 16 different personality traits contradicted Adler's theory. This research found no evidence of any "spoilage" or other pattern of maladjustment in only children. The major finding was that only children are not very different from children with siblings. The main exception to this was the finding that only children are generally higher in achievement motivation. A second analysis revealed that only children, first-borns, and children with only one sibling score higher on tests of verbal ability than later-borns and children with multiple siblings.

Later life
Spoiling in early childhood tends to create characteristic reactions that persist, fixed, into later life. These can cause significant social problems. Spoiled children may have difficulty coping with situations such as teachers scolding them or refusing to grant extensions on homework assignments, playmates refusing to allow them to play with their toys and playmates refusing playdates with them, a loss in friends, failure in employment, and failure with personal relationships. As adults, spoiled children may experience problems with anger management, professionalism, and personal relationships; a link with adult psychopathy has been observed.

See also
 Child discipline
 Freaky Friday
 Little Emperor Syndrome
 Oppositional defiant disorder
 Parenting
 Tantrum
 Grounding (punishment)

References

Further reading
 
 Ricktober (October 2004). "Spoiled".
 
 

Stock characters
Developmental psychology
Childhood
Parenting
Youth
Stereotypes